Vailia is a monotypic genus of flowering plants belonging to the family Apocynaceae. It just contains one species, Vailia mucronata Rusby

It is native to Bolivia, Ecuador and Peru.

The genus name of Vailia is in honour of Anna Murray Vail (1863–1955), an American botanist and first librarian of the New York Botanical Garden. The Latin specific epithet of mucronata means sharp-edged, from mucro, sword-point or edge.
Both the genus and the species were first described and published in Bull. Torrey Bot. Club Vol.25 on page 500 in 1898.

References

Apocynaceae
Monotypic Apocynaceae genera
Plants described in 1898
Flora of Bolivia
Flora of Ecuador
Flora of Peru